U.S. Highway 59 (US 59) in the U.S. state of Texas is named the Lloyd Bentsen Highway, after Lloyd Bentsen, former U.S. senator from Texas. In northern Houston, US 59, co-signed with Interstate 69 (I-69), is the Eastex Freeway (from Downtown Houston to the Liberty County/Montgomery County line). To the south, which is also co-signed with I-69, it is the Southwest Freeway (from Rosenberg to Downtown Houston). The stretch of the Southwest Freeway just west of The Loop was formerly one of the busiest freeways in North America, with a peak AADT of 371,000 in 1998.

US 59 (overlapped by US 71) actually straddles the border between Texas and Arkansas north of I-30 near Texarkana, with the east side of the highway on the Arkansas side and the west side of the highway on the Texas side. In the past, both highways remained on the border past I-30 as State Line Avenue to downtown Texarkana; today, only US 71 does so. Nearly 90 percent of this route is designated to become part of I-69 in the future. Currently  speed limits are allowed on US 59 in Duval County and portions of northern Polk County.

History
The US 96 designation was originally applied in 1926 from Rosenberg, Texas, near Houston, to Pharr in the Rio Grande valley. This diagonal route, south of U.S. 90, did not violate the convention of even numbers for east–west routes. The highway's east–west nature was boosted in 1934 when US 96 was rerouted from Alice to Laredo.

US 59 was extended into Texas in 1936.

Route description

Laredo to Interstate 37
US 59 begins at the Mexico–US border with Loop 20 on the World Trade International Bridge over the Rio Grande in Laredo. The portion of US 59 that is co-signed with Loop 20 is also named the Bob Bullock Loop. At under 2 miles, the two highways run together concurrent with I-69W from the Mexico–US border until I-35 in Laredo, where I-69W temporarily ends. US 59 and Loop 20 continue to run together until just south of Lake Casa Blanca, where Loop 20 heads south to Mangana-Hein Road (and potentially into Mexico) and US 59 heads towards Freer; traveling in a mostly northeast direction.  US 59 shares a short congruency with SH 44 in and around Freer. From Freer, US 59 passes through the southeastern part of McMullen County, but does not intersect any highways. The highway continues northeast, intersecting US 281 in George West, before intersecting I-37 about 55 miles north of Corpus Christi. Between Laredo and Interstate 37, US 59 passes through many rural areas and ranching sites. A significant portion of US 59 in Texas has a 75 MPH speed limit.

Interstate 37 to Houston
From I-37, US 59 heads northeast passing through Beeville. US 59 bypasses Victoria to the south, and becomes a divided highway, and has a series of interchanges, until it becomes a freeway south of Houston in Rosenberg and resumes the designation of I-69. Between Houston and Victoria, US 59 passes through Edna, Ganado, El Campo, and Wharton. US 59 intersects many major Texas highways in Houston, including I-10 (which goes to San Antonio and Beaumont) and I-45 (which goes to Dallas and Galveston).

Houston to Marshall
Leaving Houston, US 59 intersects Beltway 8 again on the northside of town, passing by Bush Intercontinental Airport and heads into Humble. Between Houston and Livingston, most of US 59 is a limited-access freeway but the I-69 designation temporarily ends at the Montgomery-Liberty county line. US 59 passes through or bypasses the towns of Cleveland and Livingston. 46 miles north of Livingston, US 59 bypasses Lufkin, where it overlaps US 69. After leaving Lufkin, US 59 crosses the Angelina River. 10 miles north of Lufkin, US 59 bypasses Nacogdoches and heads in an almost entirely east–west direction. Drivers wishing to stay on US 59 must turn left in Tenaha, where the highway intersects US 96 and ends its overlap with US 84. US 59 passes through Carthage before intersecting I-20 south of Marshall.

Marshall to Texarkana
US 59 intersects US 80 in Marshall, where US 59 is known as East End Boulevard (due to the fact the highway runs on the east side of town, near the city limits). US 59 passes through Jefferson, 15 miles west of Caddo Lake. US 59 passes through the towns of Linden and Atlanta before arriving in Bowie County. US 59 intersects SH 93 south of Texarkana, the old highway through the city. Shortly after, I-369 designation with US 59 when the freeway intersects Spur 151, where US 59 becomes a freeway on the westside of the city. Before US 59 intersects I-30, and overlaps I-30 until exit 223B, at the state line, I-369 designation ends. After leaving I-30, US 59 joins US 71, where both highways run on the state line between Texas and Arkansas, where both highways continue north towards DeQueen, Arkansas.

Future

US 59 is in the process of being upgraded between Laredo & Victoria, to become I-69W; Between Victoria & Tenaha, as I-69; and Tenaha & Texarkana, I-369. Segments of I-69 are currently designated: I-69W runs between Mexico and I-35, I-69 runs through the Houston Metro, and a segment of I-369 exists on the west side of Texarkana. The entire I-69 project in Texas does not have a completion date but according to AASHTO rules should be within 25 years of initial signage for each Segment of Independent Utility.

Exit list

Business routes
US 59 has ten signed business routes in Texas, between Carthage and its southern terminus in Laredo.

Carthage business loop

Business U.S. Highway 59-D (Bus. This is the oldest signed business route of US 59 in Texas, having been originally designated on October 21, 1959 with the hidden designation of Loop 455, after US 59 was re-routed and bypassed Carthage. Loop 455 was retired on June 21, 1990 and redesignated fully as Bus. US 59-D.

Nacogdoches business loop

Business U.S. Highway 59-F (Bus. The loop was first commissioned on October 2, 1970 along the new Loop 224 bypass around the western side of Nacogdoches. Although signed as Bus. US 59, the route had the hidden designation of Loop 495. On June 21, 1990, Loop 495 was decommissioned and the loop was fully designated as Bus. US 59-F.

Lufkin business loop

Business U.S. Highway 59-G (Bus. The loop was commissioned on June 21, 1990 from an old section of US 59, after US 59 bypassed Lufkin, being rerouted onto the eastern section of Loop 227.

Livingston business loop

Business U.S. Highway 59-J (Bus. The loop was first designated as Loop 90 on June 23, 1981, when US 59 was re-routed on the western side of town along a new bypass. On June 21, 1990, Loop 90 was redesignated as Bus. US 59-J.

Splendora business loop

Business U.S. Highway 59-L (Bus. The loop was first designated on November 3, 1972, when US 59 was moved onto a bypass on the northwest side of town. Although the new route was signed as Bus. US 59, it was given the hidden designation of Loop 512. On June 21, 1990, Loop 512 was decommissioned and properly redesignated as Bus. US 59-L.

Wharton–Hungerford business loop

Business U.S. Highway 59-R (Bus. The loop was designated on October 29, 1998, after US 59 was re-routed on an expressway along the northwest side of town.

El Campo business loop

Business U.S. Highway 59-S (Bus. The loop was formed on April 23, 1997, after US 59 was rerouted on the southeast side of town on a new expressway.

Victoria business loop

Business U.S. Highway 59-T (Bus. The route was formed on January 26, 1995 along a former section of US 59 through Victoria after US 59 proper was rerouted onto the southeastern segment of Loop 463. The loop starts at an interchange with US 59 and US 77 at the Zac Lentz Parkway southwest of Victoria, continuing on the route taken by US 59 between George West and Victoria. US 59-T meets Bus. US 77-S at a grade-separated interchange. Both Bus. US 59-T and Bus. US 77-S continue concurrently past both the southern termini of FM 285 and FM 1685 respectively, crossing a divided four-lane bridge over the Guadalupe River, then enter Victoria through the southwest side of town.

Both loops take a northeast direction onto Moody Street, then curve sharply right to the east on Rio Grande Street. At Main Street, both loops share a temporary wrong-way concurrency with US 87 for four city blocks to Navarro Street. US 87 diverges and continues south on Navarro Street, while Bus. US 77-S diverges north on the same cross street. Bus. US 59-T continues alone east through Victoria, along Houston Highway. After passing an interchange with Loop 463 at the Zac Lentz Parkway, the loop ends at the US 59 freeway on the eastern end of town.

George West business loop

Business U.S. Highway 59-X (Bus. The loop was originally formed when US 59 was rerouted south of downtown George West on March 28, 1989. The section between US 59 east of town and US 281 became Spur 589, while the remainder was signed and designated as US 281 only. Spur 589 was redesignated as Bus. US 59-X on June 21, 1990.

The loop starts at US 281 in town, at the intersection of Nueces Street and Houston Street. The loop continues six blocks east, crossing the railroad tracks, then curves southeast, ending at the US 59 expressway, outside of George West.

Laredo business loop

Business U.S. Highway 59-Z (Bus. The business loop was formed on February 27, 2014, from the older alignment of US 59 from Loop 20 to I-35, after  US 59 proper was rerouted onto Loop 20 westbound to the World Trade International Bridge at the international border. On June 26, 2014, the section of US 59 and Loop 20 between I-35 and the border was designated as a segment of I-69W. Bus. US 59-Z is known as Saunders Street along its entire length, beginning at I-35 exit 2 and ending at the US 59/Loop 20 interchange, at the eastern end of Laredo.

See also

 List of U.S. Highways in Texas
 list of highways numbered 59

Notes

References

External links

 

59
 Texas
Laredo, Texas
Transportation in Webb County, Texas
Transportation in Duval County, Texas
Transportation in McMullen County, Texas
Transportation in Live Oak County, Texas
Transportation in Bee County, Texas
Transportation in Goliad County, Texas
Transportation in Victoria County, Texas
Transportation in Jackson County, Texas
Transportation in Wharton County, Texas
Transportation in Fort Bend County, Texas
Transportation in Harris County, Texas
Transportation in Montgomery County, Texas
Transportation in Liberty County, Texas
Transportation in San Jacinto County, Texas
Transportation in Polk County, Texas
Transportation in Angelina County, Texas
Transportation in Nacogdoches County, Texas
Transportation in Rusk County, Texas
Transportation in Shelby County, Texas
Transportation in Panola County, Texas
Transportation in Harrison County, Texas
Transportation in Marion County, Texas
Transportation in Cass County, Texas
Transportation in Bowie County, Texas